A list of films produced in Spain in 1979 (see 1979 in film).

1979

External links
 Spanish films of 1979 at the Internet Movie Database

1979
Lists of 1979 films by country or language
Films